Navrški Vrh is a small dispersed settlement in the hills immediately south of Ravne na Koroškem in the Carinthia region in northern Slovenia.

References

External links
Navrški Vrh on Geopedia

Populated places in the Municipality of Ravne na Koroškem